Asura semivitrea is a moth of the family Erebidae. It is found in Australia (Queensland).

References

semivitrea
Moths described in 1913
Taxa named by Walter Rothschild
Moths of Australia